The 1954 San Francisco State Gators football team represented San Francisco State College—now known as San Francisco State University—as a member of the Far Western Conference (FWC) during the 1954 college football season. Led by fifth-year head coach Joe Verducci, San Francisco State compiled an overall record of 8–2 with a mark of 5–0 in conference play, winning the FWC title. For the season the team outscored its opponents 253 to 120. The Gators played home games at Cox Stadium in San Francisco.

Schedule

Notes

References

San Francisco State
San Francisco State Gators football seasons
Northern California Athletic Conference football champion seasons
San Francisco State Gators football